Jean Stapleton (born Jeanne Murray; January 19, 1923 – May 31, 2013) was an American character actress of stage, television and film.

Stapleton was best known for playing Edith Bunker, the perpetually optimistic and devoted wife of Archie Bunker, on the 1970s sitcom All in the Family, a role that earned her three Emmys and two Golden Globes for Best Actress in a comedy series. She also made occasional appearances on the All in the Family follow-up series Archie Bunker's Place, but asked to be written out of the show during the first season due to becoming tired of the role.

Early life
Stapleton was born on January 19, 1923, in Manhattan, the daughter of Marie A. Stapleton, an opera singer, and Joseph E. Murray, a billboard advertising salesman. She had an elder brother, Jack. Her uncle was a vaudevillian performer, and her brother was a stage actor who inspired her to pursue acting as well.

Early career
 
Stapleton began her career in 1941 aged 18 in summer stock theatre and made her New York debut in the Off-Broadway play American Gothic. She was featured on Broadway in several hit musicals, such as Funny Girl, Juno, Damn Yankees and Bells Are Ringing, recreating her parts from the latter two musicals in the film versions of Damn Yankees (1958) (her film debut) and Bells Are Ringing (1960).

Stapleton's early television roles included parts in Starlight Theatre, Robert Montgomery Presents, Lux Video Theater, Woman with a Past, The Philco-Goodyear Television Playhouse, The Patty Duke Show, Dr. Kildare, My Three Sons, Dennis the Menace, Naked City, and as Rosa Criley in a 1963 episode of NBC's medical drama about psychiatry, The Eleventh Hour, entitled "The Bride Wore Pink". In 1962, Stapleton guest-starred as Mrs. Larsen in "The Hidden Jungle", an episode of the TV series The Defenders (broadcast on December 1 that year), alongside her future All in the Family co-star Carroll O'Connor.

Stapleton also appeared in the feature films Something Wild (1961), Up the Down Staircase (1967), Klute (1971) and the Norman Lear comedy Cold Turkey (also 1971).

Stapleton bested both Mary Tyler Moore and Marlo Thomas for the "Best Actress in a Comedy" Primetime Emmy award on May 9, 1971. She was offered a role in the feature film Willy Wonka & the Chocolate Factory (1971) as Mrs. Teevee, but declined because it coincided with the production of the All in the Family pilot (the role went to Nora Denney).

All in the Family (1971–1979)
Stapleton's best known role, as Edith in All in the Family, began in 1971. The show was originally broadcast on the CBS network for nine seasons from January 12, 1971, to April 8, 1979, for a total of 205 episodes. The role earned her three Emmys and two Golden Globes.

Feeling her character had run its course, Stapleton continued the role of Edith for only five more episodes in the follow-up series Archie Bunker's Place to help the transition, and then Edith was written out via stroke, offscreen, in the 1st episode of season two.

Later career
Stapleton appeared in the Emmy Award-winning TV movie Tail Gunner Joe (1977), dramatizing the life of U.S. Senator Joseph R. McCarthy, and later guest-starred in the sixth episode of the third season of The Muppet Show (broadcast on September 30, 1978).

In 1979, she featured in the original Canadian production of the musical Something's Afoot, which was later broadcast on Showtime. She played the title role in the Hallmark Hall of Fame TV movie, Aunt Mary (also 1979), which detailed the true story of Baltimore children's advocate Mary Dobkin. In 1982, Stapleton portrayed Eleanor Roosevelt in the TV movie Eleanor, First Lady of the World, focusing on the subject's later life. The role earned her Emmy and Golden Globe nominations for Best Actress.

She continued to guest-star in a number of television series during the 1980s including two episodes of Faerie Tale Theatre — in 1983 and 1985 editions entitled "Jack and the Beanstalk" as the Giant's Wife and "Cinderella" as the Fairy Godmother — Scarecrow and Mrs. King and The Love Boat. Stapleton also co-starred in the film The Buddy System (1984), alongside Susan Sarandon and Richard Dreyfuss, and played Ariadne Oliver in the 1986 television adaptation of Dead Man's Folly, opposite Peter Ustinov as Hercule Poirot. She declined the role of Jessica Fletcher in the TV series Murder, She Wrote, which went to Angela Lansbury.

From 1990 to 1991, Stapleton co-starred with Whoopi Goldberg in 15 episodes of Bagdad Cafe, the television series based on the movie of the same name.

In 1994, Stapleton played the role of Mrs. Piggle-Wiggle in a children's series of the same name based on the books by Betty MacDonald.

In 1996, Stapleton appeared in the educational series Beakman's World as Beakman's mother, Beakmom, and also appeared on Everybody Loves Raymond playing Ray's imperious aunt. The same year, she appeared in the Murphy Brown episode "All in the Family" playing Miles's grandmother, Nana Silverberg, and also played opposite John Travolta in Nora Ephron's hit film Michael as the eccentric rooming house owner, Pansy Milbank.

Making a debut in the world of video games, Stapleton was the voice of Grandma Ollie on KinderActive, Turner Pictures, and New Line Cinema's venture Grandma Ollie's Morphabet Soup. The game won a Teacher's Choice Award from Learning Magazine.

On January 26, 1998, Stapleton guest-starred on the Jean Smart sitcom Style & Substance in the episode "A Recipe for Disaster", playing a former television chef who has an alcohol problem. She voiced John Rolfe's maid, Mrs. Jenkins, in Disney's 1998 direct-to-video animated film Pocahontas II: Journey to a New World, and appeared in the film You've Got Mail as a close co-worker in whom Meg Ryan's character confides. From 1998, Stapleton took her "Eleanor" characterization to live theaters, now adapted as a one-woman show.

In May 2000, Stapleton appeared in "Mother's Day", an episode of the TV series Touched by an Angel, portraying an angel named Emma who came to help Celine who was taking care of her late best friend's mother.

Stapleton's final acting role was as Irene Silverman in the 2001 fact-based TV movie, Like Mother, Like Son: The Strange Story of Sante and Kenny Kimes, starring Mary Tyler Moore as convicted criminal Sante Kimes.

Stapleton was inducted into the American Theatre Hall of Fame in 2002. She was also inducted into the Television Hall of Fame that same year.

Personal life
Stapleton was married to William Putch from 1957 until his death in 1983. The couple had two children: actor/writer/director John Putch and television producer Pamela Putch.
For 30 years, William Putch directed a summer stock theater, Totem Pole Playhouse, at Caledonia State Park in Fayetteville, Pennsylvania. Stapleton performed regularly at the theatre with the resident company. Stapleton's brother, Jack Stapleton, was a stage actor. Her cousin was actress Betty Jane Watson. Stapleton was active in the Christian Science church. She was unrelated to actress Maureen Stapleton, contrary to a common misconception.

Stapleton supported Walter Mondale's campaign in the 1984 presidential election, was a vocal supporter of the Equal Rights Amendment, and took an active role in the 1977 National Women's Conference.

Stapleton rarely appeared on talk shows, but reunited on-camera with Carroll O'Connor on Donny and Marie Osmond's show on April 24, 2000, a little over a year before O'Connor's death. When the Osmonds asked her to perform in Edith Bunker's voice, she jokingly told them that she only does so "for pay". 
Stapleton admitted that she seldom watched All in the Family, but by 2000 she reconsidered, she told the Archive of American Television.

Death and reaction
Stapleton died at her apartment in Manhattan on May 31, 2013, at age 90.

Norman Lear said, "No one gave more profound 'how to be a human being' lessons than Jean Stapleton." Roseanne Barr said that Stapleton's range was "unbelievable, deep, and majestic." Co-star Rob Reiner said, "Working with her was one of the greatest experiences of my life." Sally Struthers said, "Jean lived so in the present. She was a Christian Scientist who didn't say or think a negative thing ... She was just a walking, living angel".

The marquee lights on Broadway were dimmed for one minute on June 5, 2013, at 8 p.m. EDT, to honor the memory of Stapleton. She is buried at Lincoln Cemetery in Chambersburg, Pennsylvania.

Filmography

Films

Television

References

External links

 
 
 
 
 
 Obituary on BroadwayWorld

1923 births
2013 deaths
20th-century American actresses
21st-century American actresses
Actresses from New York City
American Christian Scientists
American film actresses
American musical theatre actresses
American stage actresses
American television actresses
Best Musical or Comedy Actress Golden Globe (television) winners
New York (state) Democrats
Outstanding Performance by a Lead Actress in a Comedy Series Primetime Emmy Award winners
People from Manhattan